Gurgesiella is a genus of fish in the family Gurgesiellidae. These relatively small deep-water skates are found in the Atlantic and Pacific Oceans off South and Central America.

Species
 Gurgesiella atlantica (Bigelow & Schroeder, 1962) (Atlantic pygmy skate)
 Gurgesiella dorsalifera McEachran & Compagno, 1980 (Onefin skate)
 Gurgesiella furvescens F. de Buen, 1959 (Dusky finless skate)

References 

 

 
Rajidae
Ray genera
Taxa named by Fernando de Buen y Lozano
Taxonomy articles created by Polbot